was a leader of the Soga clan and a statesman during the reign of Emperor Kinmei in the Asuka period. He was the first person to hold the position of Ōomi that can be verified with reasonable accuracy, in 536 A.D.  Essentially what this means: Japan's first head of government (or more precisely Yamato's) with the Ōkimi (later denoted Emperor) as head of state.

He was the son of Soga no Koma and the father of Soga no Umako.  

Soga no Iname solidified his power by marrying two of his daughters, Soga no Kitashihime and Soga no Oanegimi, to Emperor Kinmei. Between the two of them they gave birth to three future emperors, Emperor Yōmei, Emperor Sushun and Empress Suiko, as well as numerous other princes and princesses.

Soga no Iname is also known for his early support of Buddhism which, according to the Nihon Shoki, was introduced to the Yamato court from Paekche in 552. (However, according to a different source, the Jōgū Shōtoku Hōō Teisetsu, it was introduced in 538.) Opposing Iname and against the acceptance of this new foreign religion were Mononobe no Okoshi and Nakatomi no Kamako. The rivalry between the Sogas and the Mononobe and Nakatomi clans would carry on into future generations, with Iname's son Soga no Umako defeating Okoshi's son Mononobe no Moriya in 587, and his grandson and great-grandson Soga no Emishi and Soga no Iruka being defeated by a descendant of Kamako, Nakatomi no Kamatari, in the Isshi Incident.

Family 
Parents
Father: Soga no Koma (蘇我 高麗) 
Mother: Unknown
Spouse(s) and issue: 
Wife: Bijohime (美女媛)
Wife: Lady Agako (吾田子)
Wife: Unknown women
First Daughter: Soga no Kitashihime (蘇我 堅塩媛), Consort of Emperor Kinmei, Mother of Emperor Yōmei and Empress Suiko
First Son: Soga no Umako (蘇我 馬子, 551– 19 June 626)
Second Daughter:  Soga no Oane (蘇我小姉君), Consort of Emperor Kinmei , Mother of Emperor Sushun
Third Daughter: Soga no Ishikina (蘇我石寸名), Concubine of Emperor Yōmei
Second Son: Sakaibe no Marise (境部 摩理勢, d. 628)
Third Son: Kojoshin (小祚臣)

Soga clan
570 deaths
People of Kofun-period Japan
People of Asuka-period Japan
Buddhism in the Kofun period
Buddhism in the Asuka period
Year of birth unknown